The Omid Djalili Show is a British sketch comedy/stand-up comedy television show produced by the BBC and directed by Michael Cumming. Writing by Omid Djalili, Will Smith, Roger Drew, Ian Stone, Ricky Grover Michael Cumming, Rich Fulcher and Ivor Dembina (series one) with script editor Steve Punt. The theme tune is a piece of Salsa music called "Amor Verdadero", performed by the Afro-Cuban All Stars.

It was first broadcast on 17 November 2007 in the network's primetime Saturday night slot.

It is also broadcast in Australia on ABC1, in Denmark on DR2, in Estonia on ETV2 in 2010, in Israel on yes stars Comedy, in Germany on WDR and in Portugal on RTP2.

The second series was recorded late 2008 and was first broadcast on 20 April 2009 on BBC One.

Episode list

Series 1

Series 2

References

External links

BBC television comedy
2000s British comedy television series
2007 British television series debuts
2009 British television series endings
Television series by Hat Trick Productions
English-language television shows